Newport Gardner (born Occramer Marycoo, 1746–1826) was an African American singing school master and composer. He was an early proponent of the Back-to-Africa movement.

Musical career
Gardner was transported to the colonies as a slave at the age of fourteen, where he was sold to Caleb Gardner, a young merchant in Newport, Rhode Island. After showing an ability for making music, Gardner's wife arranged for Newport to study with a singing master, most likely Andrew Law. In 1791, Gardner won a lottery in which he secured enough money to buy freedom for himself and his family. Gardner rented the upstairs of a house in Newport, Rhode Island, where he started his own singing school. He was also a composer, and started writing music at the age of eighteen possibly becoming published as early as 1803 with the song Crooked Shanks from the collection A Number of Original Airs, Duettos and Trios. He also composed the Promise Anthem. Although the music has been lost, the text is still preserved and is based on passages from the Bible (Jeremiah 30:1-3, 10; Mark 7:27-28).

Church activities
Gardner was also a prominent member in the religious and educational communities of Newport. He served as a deacon in the First Congregational Church, and as headmaster at a school for black children. Gardner also helped found the Colored Union Church, Newport's first black church, in 1824. The Congregational Church in Boston ordained him as a deacon the following year.

Gardner was also a founder and early member of the Free African Union Society in Newport, the first African benefit society in the United States.

Return to Africa and death
In January 1826 at the age of 80, Gardner sailed from Boston  on the brig Vine with 31 fellow Africans to Liberia. The ship made it to Liberia, but many in the party including Gardner fell ill with fever and died within a year. Gardner was buried, as he had always wished, in Africa.

References

1746 births
1826 deaths
18th-century American composers
18th-century American slaves
18th-century male musicians
18th-century musicians
19th-century American composers
19th-century American male musicians
African-American composers
African-American male composers
African-American music educators
Free Negroes
Musicians from Newport, Rhode Island
People of colonial Rhode Island